Marinaldo Cícero da Silva (born 21 September 1986), known as Chumbinho, is a Brazilian professional footballer .

Career
In July 2013, after four years in Greece, Chumbinho signed a two-year contract with Azerbaijan Premier League side Qarabağ. Signing a new two-year contract with Qarabağ in July 2015. On 23 January 2016, the Brazilian midfielder is already in Greece, to complete his deal with Atromitos. he 28-year-old former player of Qarabağ will pass the medical examinations and sign a contract until the summer of 2017 with his new club. On 13 June 2016, he signed a two years' contract with his former club Levadiakos for an undisclosed fee. In November 2018 he was released by the club.

Club statistics

Honours
Qarabağ
Azerbaijan Premier League (2): 2013–14, 2014-15
Azerbaijan Cup: (1) 2014-15

References
J. League

External links

1986 births
Living people
Brazilian footballers
São Paulo FC players
América Futebol Clube (SP) players
Associação Atlética Ponte Preta players
Coritiba Foot Ball Club players
Rio Claro Futebol Clube players
Clube Atlético Sorocaba players
Kashima Antlers players
Leixões S.C. players
Olympiacos F.C. players
Panserraikos F.C. players
OFI Crete F.C. players
Atromitos F.C. players
Qarabağ FK players
Levadiakos F.C. players
Primeira Liga players
J1 League players
Super League Greece players
Football League (Greece) players
Azerbaijan Premier League players
Brazilian expatriate footballers
Expatriate footballers in Japan
Expatriate footballers in Greece
Expatriate footballers in Azerbaijan
Brazilian expatriate sportspeople in Japan
Brazilian expatriate sportspeople in Greece
Brazilian expatriate sportspeople in Azerbaijan
Association football midfielders
Ethnikos Piraeus F.C. players